Asadabad (also Romanized as Asadābād) is a village in Lar Rural District, Laran District, Shahrekord County, Chaharmahal and Bakhtiari Province, Iran. At the 2006 census, its population was 719, in 188 families. The village is populated by Persians.

References 

Populated places in Shahr-e Kord County